Cymbastela is a genus of sponges in the family Axinellidae.

List of species 
 Cymbastela cantharella (Lévi, 1983)
 Cymbastela concentrica (Lendenfeld 1887)
 Cymbastela coralliophila Hooper & Bergquist, 1992
 Cymbastela lamellata  (Bergquist, 1961)
 Cymbastela marshae Hooper & Bergquist, 1992
 Cymbastela notiaina Hooper & Bergquist, 1992
 Cymbastela sodwaniensis  Samaai, Pillay & Kelly, 2009
 Cymbastela stipitata (Bergquist & Tizard, 1967)
 Cymbastela vespertina Hooper & Bergquist, 1992

References 

Axinellidae
Sponge genera
Taxa named by Patricia Bergquist
Taxa named by John Hooper (marine biologist)